Nam Yu-jin (Korean: 남유진; born December 8, 1995), better known as Eyedi (Korean: 아이디), is a South Korean singer, songwriter, composer and actress. She debuted in 2016 under Bace Camp Studios with the self written single titled 'Sign' and released her first album, Mix B, in 2017.  

Eyedi finished in fifth place out of 98 girls on the survival reality show MixNine in 2017, where she revealed in an interview that she was offered debut as a member of a new girlgroup by YG Entertainment, and was a cast member on the reality show Studio Vibes in 2019,where the producer reached out to her to appear on the show and then was cast in the Web-drama 'Thumbs Up Feeds Me (2020)' (좋아요가 밥먹여줍니다) and played the character of Lee Eun Byul  which was broadcast on YouTube under the channel 룰루랄라 스토리랩- Lululala Story Laband Naver TV

Her stage name translates to ID (identity) in Korean with the purpose of listening to her music and recognising it as her song

General Information 
Her interest in music first started when she was dreaming about becoming a singer back in her second year of high school when she joined the singing club and she mentioned how she also dreamed about being a fashion designer since she enjoyed art and drawing. She also mentioned that her favorite song that she has released was her debut single named 'Sign feat Loopy'  since it has a deep meaning to her.

Nam also mentioned her various interests in fashion and makeup stating: "If it wasn't for music, I'm interested enough to major in fashion. More than 90% of the costumes and props in the music video are my collection. I tend to actively give opinions on the concept of my activities, so I think I can show you various aspects in the future."

During her interview with Pops in Seoul, she mentioned how she started composing music before her debut which has not been released yet, and she has made a lot of mixtapes before her debut. She also mentioned how she composed music as a way to study composition but she felt it was not good enough for her to show them off to the public. Then she gained recognition from the head of her agency for her composition of her song 'Tomorrowland' and now her albums are composed mostly of her songs. As a songwriter, she said she is heavily influenced by colors, and that is why her single 'Red' was titled that. She mentioned that she often goes to art galleries and she draws inspiration from the sunsets that she sees on her way home from work

She had also mentioned how she admires the likes of Stevie Wonder and Beyoncé as she wishes to become a singer that represents her generation. In an interview with Arirang Radio in May 2019, she mentioned that her number 1 song on her playlist was 'Dalla Dalla' by ITZY, and from the show MixNine she became friends with member Ryujin and when Ryujin saw the teaser for Eyedi's appearance of Studio Vibes, she called Eyedi and asked her if she is doing well. Eyedi loves the song so much so that she loves singing it when she does karaoke.

She also said how her music video for Luv Highway was supposed to be shot in Okinawa but it coincided with the Japanese holidays so she couldn't film there

She has also mentioned how she would like to have a collaboration with Lee Su-hyun from Akdong Musician as she admires her voice as well as Taemin from SHINee as he has developed his style of music and she would like to work with that, and Jay Park as mentioned on her interview with Arirang Radio because she believes that Jay Park has great energy and if they were to work together they would make great music and she would want it to be something upbeat.

Since she loves eating bread, her fans set up a 'Bread Live' where the fans set up a place for her to eat bread and she sang songs while meeting fans, Eyedi has a reputation for doing her fan meetings in innovative ways.

Eyedi has also created a 'Selected by Eyedi' Playlist on AWA Fm, a Japanese Streaming site which includes artists such as: The Weeknd, Sam Smith, Normani, Jamila Woods, Lucky Daye and many more artists as well as herself

Career: 2016-Present

2016

Debut as a solo artist 

Eyedi made her debut on July 19, 2016, under Bace Camp Studios with the single titled 'Sign' which was written by herself, Loopy, and Francis plus co produced by Eyedi. Eyedi reached out to Loopy to work on the song after watching his YouTube Videos before he debuted. "I got to know Loopy on YouTube before his debut in Korea. He wasn't that known yet. Before his debut, I was so impressed with a few of his videos, and I contacted him because I wanted to work with him, and he willingly joined.”  

He is very kind, but he is a very professional and meticulous musician. I think that's why my debut song “Sign” came out great. The single album contained an instrumental version and was released digitally and had a physical album. The music video was filmed in Los Angeles, but due to a malfunction, the footage was lost and they had to use behind-the-scenes footage of the trip for the music video instead, creating a vlog style video. Then a few days later on July 21, she attended 2016 INTERNATIONAL FASHION WEEK in Zhengzhou where she performed her debut song for the first time and a cover of Firework by Katy Perry. A few days after that, she held her first fan signing event on the 23rd July 2016 and then on July 27, 2016, she appeared on SBS Radio and performed a cover of What You Do by Chrisette Michel which showed off more of her talented vocals. 

A few months later on November 8, 2016, she came back with the single album titled 'Not Lonely' which included the title track called 'Not Lonely', plus an acoustic version of 'Sign' as well as the instrumental for 'Not Lonely'. She released a music video for Not lonely which was a minimalistic concept, featuring dark colors and occasional bright fairy-lights.

Just under a month later, Eyedi performed the acoustic version of 'Sign' at the 'Acoustic X De Rêve Fashion Show'. However this was not the end of activities for Eyedi. on December 12, 2016, Eyedi released a 30 second recording snippet of a song called 'Type K' on Bace Camp Studio YouTube channel of her in the studio recording the song. Finally, her last activity in 2016 was her appearance on Star News, where she explained that her song 'Not Lonely' was a gift for her fans<ref>{{Citation|title=[생방송 스타뉴스] 아이디, 외롭지 않아' 팬들 위한 선물'|url=https://www.youtube.com/watch?v=HfikyPa0nT0&list=PLQ_qQyOst1RQrsJOzVuPUywop38IZ1U-o&index=125|language=en|access-date=2021-03-29}}</ref> This interview on 14th December 2016 concluded her activities for that year.

 2017 
 Release of 'Chapter 21' 
January 5th, Mario Winans uploaded a 'Shout out to Eyedi' where he expressed his feelings of excitement of collaborating with her on the track 'Type E'. Eyedi revealed in an interview that she reached out to Winans, "I often get inspiration from the music of the past rather than the trendy ones. I still like to listen to TLC or Babyface, etc. So I always wanted to work with legendary pop musicians I got inspiration from or I liked to listen to. Then I happened to make a song that required a male vocal. While looking for a vocal that suits the vibe, Mario Winans popped into my head. I sent him a love call with the explanation of the song, and apparently he was interested in K-pop. That's how I got to work with him, and I plan to work with more legendary pop musicians in the future." 

On January 16, 2017, Eyedi released her 3rd single album named 'Chapter 21' which featured a Korean and English version of the song 'Type' as well as an instrumental of the song. The Korean version of the song had a music video which showed a very different side of Eyedi than what was previously shown earlier, and the Music Video featured choreography, something that was not shown in previous music videos. Kim Hyo Eun who rose to fame after his appearance on Show Me The Money 3 was featured on the Korean version of the track and Mario Winans was featured on the English version of this track. 

On January 21, A making Film of the English version of Type was released on YouTube which included small snippets of the dance choreography. Although there is no full choreography video, a longer amount of clips of the dance were uploaded on January 30, 2017 on a video titled 'Eyedi Daily [2017.01.30] which excited fans since she had never shown her dance skill.

 Release of 'Mix B' 
After a month and a few days of no music releases, on March 17, 2017, Eyedi dropped a MV teaser for her song called 'Best Mistake' which had a completely different sound to Type or her previous releases. From a first listen the song was a very sulttry, RnB style song which excited her fans as Eyedi was showing more sides of her as an artist. 2 days later on March 19, the name of the Album 'Mix B' was announced and a teaser of the album was uploaded. The album included a remastered version of her debut single 'Sign feat Loopy' as well as 5 new tracks, all of which she participated writing on (apart from the English versions of these songs). She wrote 'Falling (feat AKASTON)', and 'Best Mistake K', (the title track) all on her own. The album contained 10 tracks all together alongside 3 instrumental tracks for Best Mistake, Falling and Taste The Party. 

On March 21, 2017, Mix B was released and Best Mistake K MV was released on YouTube

Later that year, on April 7 Bace Camp Studio posted a video of Eyedi attending the 2017 FW Seoul Fashion week which was exciting for Eyedi who is a huge fan of Fashion. On April 14 she had her first music show performance on Show Champion with Best Mistake which showed off her stable vocals. 

On June 9, 2017, Eyedi starred in her first CF for FUNPICK X Pikicast and the on July 1 she held her second fan meeting at the Union Art Fair

 Release of 'Tomorrowland EP' 
On August 4, 2017, just over a year after her debut, Eyedi released her first EP titled 'Tomorrowland' featuring the tracks 'Tomorrowland' and 'Dreamcatcher'. along with instrumentals for both of those tracks, During her interview with Pops in Seoul and with OH! Press interview, in 2019  she revealed how her song 'Tomorrowland' was made for a suicide prevention campaign and her words were "Because suicide is a serious issue, I ruminated on the lyrics as I wrote them in hopes of giving people strength, even if a little. After that song was released a lot of people told me that they gained strength from it and they thanked me for it. I was very grateful for the fact that I could have such a positive impact on others and that I could be in this valuable position. Because of this experience, I've gained a sense of responsibility and that's probably the biggest change since my debut."

She also revealed in another interview "On internet, I have seen the some people's posts made right before they committed suicide. It's normal to think they have left a lot in that posts, right? But in fact, the posts were very simple and flat. If someone was there by them, they would have been a great help to them; it's sad that there was no one. So the album I made to be the strength for those is “Tomorrowland.” 

 MixNine appearance 
On October 29, 2017, Eyedi and labelmate Sarada auditioned for MixNine a reality survival show aired on JTBC where 72 male trainees competed against 98 female trainees. Eyedi auditioned with the song 'Spotlight' by Jennifer Hudson and from there she did quite well, with her rank increasing from 69 on the first episode to 20 on Episode 4. From there her rank rose to 18 on Episode 5, 15 on Episode 7, 10 on Episode 8 and remained 10 on Episode 10 then rose to 6 on Episode 11, dropped to 7 on Episode 13 and then rose to 5 on Episode 14, placing her in the debut line-up for the female team. However, on the last episode the female team lost to the male team, with the female group garnering 7,886 votes and male team winning with 8,114 votes

Before Eyedi joined the show, she was under the impression that it was not an idol programme. She was under the impression that MixNine was a show where underrated artists were uncovered and brought to the spotlight to showcase their talent so she thought it would be a good opportunity for her However upon joining the show she was deceived as the purpose was to set up an idol kpop group. However, she does not regret participating on MixNine as she felt that she learnt a lot and had a valuable experience.

On December 3, Eyedi and Jung Sara (Sarada) uploaded a dance cover of 'I Got You' by Bebe Rexha on YouTube.

Eyedi performed various songs in a group while being on MixNine, the first being MIXNINE PART.3 - 'JUST DANCE(소녀 ver)' (girls version) is posted on YG ENTERTAINMENT YouTube Channel on November 19, 2017, where you can see Nam performing at timestamp 1:49. From that performance, the judges (Yang Hyun Suk, Zion.T, Seungri and JENNIE) along with 400 Audience Members ranked Nam Yujin 48th Place. 

On Episode 6, she was voted by her female trainee group to be an ending fairy (person who ends the performance) for their group cover of Rain by Taeyeon, However, Suran suggested another trainee to do so and Eyedi instead was the Opening Fairy. The name of the team was called Bivid, and it consisted of Park Haerin, Kim Juyeon, Go Ahra, Im Sohyeon, Lee Yesol, Nam Yujin (herself), Hur Yeonjoo, Baek Da Ae, Moon Eun Jin and Kim Suhyun. From the individual scores of the female team, Eyedi came third with 598 votes, and the female team won over the male team.

On Episode 8 she did another group cover, this time with the song I'm Your Girl by S.E.S. Hyunjin from the girlgroup LOONA chose Eyedi to be a part of this group cover as she chose participants who fit the image of the song and are vocally skilled. From this performance Yang Hyun Suk complimented Eyedi on her dancing, since she was not previously skilled in dancing but had performed the song very well.  he also said "you call yourself an artist and it looks like you work very hard behind the scenes". From this group cover she ranked 5th with 100 points and on Episode 10 it was revealed that she was in 10th Place and passed the elimination round.

On Episode 11, Jung Il-Hoon helped compose the song 'HUSH' which the group called MY 9M performed with Eyedi as a member. In this performance, Yang Hyun Suk complimented Eyedi saying that she stood out a lot. She ranked 4th place in individual ranking with 288 votes.

On Episode 13, she ranked 7th place at the beginning of the episode for her unique voice and was selected to join the 'Come Over' stage. Then on the final episode, Episode 14 it was revealed that Eyedi Ranked 5th place overall placing her in the Top 9 Team meaning if the girls team won against the boys team she would have debuted in the female group. However the male team won but due to complications their debut was cancelled. 

 2018 

 Release of Second EP 
After MixNine, she released her second EP titled 'Luv Highway' with the title track called 'Luv Highway' and the second track being called 'A Midsummer night's dream'. She uploaded music videos for both tracks and the EP includes instrumentals for both songs. The MV for Luv Highway stars Eyedi and Lee Jong-won who acted as a couple going on a date which reflects the sweet lyrics. It was Eyedi's first time acting a role in her music video, and it is important to realise Eyedi has a passion for acting so it was exciting for her. Luv Highway's MV released on May 16 and A Midsummer Night's dream MV released on May 24, 2018. Luv Highway Charted 67 on the Gaon Album Chart. 

 Japanese debut 
Eyedi also made her debut in Japan with a Japanese mini album under Pony Canyon called coll[a]ction with a Japanese version of her song 'Sign' featuring Jinmenusagi, with the music video released on August 10, 2018, on Pony Crayon's YouTube Channel. The music video was shot in Tokyo and the music video was focused on colour The name coll[a]ction was explained to be a mixture of the words 'collection' and action' as they wanted the mini album to express the feeling of capturing Eyedi's songs.

 Release of 'Red' 
She released her fifth single 'Red' on September 21 with a music video which showed off more of her vocal color and had a calming jazz theme to it which suits its name. While this was announced, she was promoting her debut Japanese song in Japan and she was selected to perform at 2018 MU:CON in Seoul which was presented by The Ministry of Sports, Caffeine and Tourism for South Korea, KOCCA and MDC. WOW.TVKR named Eyedi 'R&B Queen' and announced the release of Red and said that it was a "jazz-style soul classic R&B that embodies a deeper and more vintage sound than a trendy style, as a musician who usually performed music activities based on retro sound. Eyedi herself worked on this song from the selection of instruments to the sound" which was typical of Eyedi who was always heavily involved in the music she creates.  

On October 19, Eyedi went on to promote Luv Highway and Red on the radio show 'Pops in Seoul' while introducing herself and how she got into music and then performing 'Red' which has english subtitles so the international viewers would be able to understand. after her performance of Red, she performed Luv highway which showed off her stable and sweet vocals 

Soon after on 21 October, she held her first concert titled 'The Red Station' in Korea which was held at c \smcThe Rolling Hall in Seogyo-dong, Mapo-gu, Seoul where she performed: Red, Dreamcatcher, Luv Highway, cover of Sinead Harnett - If You Let Me, cover of Chrisette Michele - What You Do, Taste the Party (E), Best Mistake, A Midsummer Night's Dream, cover of Olivia Ong - Have I Told You Lately, Tomorrowland, The Night and finished with Sign.  

On 1 November, her full appearance on MU:CON was uploaded on VLIVE and YouTube where her setlist consisted of five tracks: Luv Highway, Red, Tomorrowland, The Night and finished with Sign. This live performance showcased her amazing vocals and showed her stage presence.  

 Release of 'Caffeine' 
Finally wrapping up her releases of 2018, her final single was titled 'Caffeine' and was released on December 17. The song was a very retro theme set in the night and featured very strong dark colors. This song went on to be her most streamed song on Spotify 

 2019 

 '&New' 
On April 6, Eyedi released another single called &New which quickly rose to fame as one of her most popular songs for the distorted retro sound that it featured. The video is currently her most viewed music video and has surpassed 25K likes on YouTube, as well as being her 2nd most streamed song on Spotify. It quickly caught the eyes of the public for its unique sound and video which was described as being " an extension of the “Caffeine” which was announced in December last year. Relatively, while “Caffeine” was sexy & dreamy, “& New” is a little younger, cuter, and adorable" another blog described the song by saying "Part of the loop was deliberately crushed to give the feeling of an elongated cassette tape. It was a little awkward at first, but this distortion gave a point to the song" which shows the different feeling that the song had given.

 Opening of her YouTube Channel 
On June 6, 2019, Eyedi opened her own YouTube channel called 해드림! (Hey, Dream) where fans submit stories to Eyedi via YouTube comment section and she selects a winner. The winner is then contacted by Eyedi and their "wishes are fulfilled" meaning she would meet with them. Many fans have met Eyedi through her YouTube channel. She also had a series called 'EyeDday'  where she would upload vlogs about her daily life. Currently there are no English captions available on these videos but there are Korean captions. Eyedi has also uploaded a singing cover clip on June 20, 2019, from her appearance on Studio Vibes where she and another participant covered Make You Feel My Love by singer Bob Dylan. 

 Release of 'Perfect Sixth Sense' 
In 2019 she released her second Japanese single titled 'Perfect 6th Sense' with the music video dropping on August 5 and light was used expressively in the music video which appropriately matches the sound of the song, which is described as " The song is a POP-based dance number, starting with repeated synths and strings sounds that raise expectations. A highly addictive summer club party that leads to a rusty, intense beat".  The song was described as an "Invitation to Eyedi's music world, which is fascinating through activities in Japan, It depicts the liberation of oneself to challenge music." As usual, Eyedi was involved in the production of the music, as well as songwriting and composition. The name Perfect 6th Sense has the intention of Awakening "6th Sense" with Eyedi's music" as she has quite a unique style compared to other artists.

The music video was quite different from other that Eyedi had released in the past, and in an interview with Recochoku she said that the highlights of her video was the colours that were used, "I would like you to see the use of colors in the music video. The makeup and costumes used there use the most gorgeous colors I have ever had. The fans who actually watched the music video were also surprised. It's a lot more flashy than the ones I've shown so far, and I think that's the key point for this time." She also mentioned that  "I think this song is the best song for drive music. Everyone is summer, so I think I'll take a break and go somewhere, but I'd like you to listen to this song to get excited at that time, and I'm sure it will be exciting if you listen to it. If you drive while playing a song, you will get good energy, so please listen to it" (roughly translated from Korean) 

 Release of '7UP' 
On December 8, 2019, the MU:CON Collab track named '7UP' was released as part of a global project and Eyedi was involved in the writing and composing of the track alongside Kevin Wild from Bad Royale and others and the song was described to be "an electronica and pop music, with the bass rhythm hand clap and drum loop playing together which added a dreamy atmosphere". She was selected as "a musician representing the next generation of K-POP". The song did not have a music video however it was released as a digital single and was more upbeat and bubbly than her previous releases such as 'Caffeine' and '&New'

 2020 

 Release of 'J.us.T', Web drama and Teaser for new EP 
On March 13, 2020, she released her 10th single titled J.usT She also uploaded a making film on March 26, 2020  for the music video of  J.us.T

Following her last comeback on March 13, 2020, it had been almost 9 months without any confirmation of new music from the singer. On 8th December 2020, Eyedi posted a short 60-second snippet of a song captioned 'For' (Prod. NEMA) #2021'' on her Instagram page, which led fans to believe that she would have a new 2021 release. The song is a sweet-sounding ballad that is believed to be for the fans (known as Passwords) who have waited for her all this time as she went on a one-year unannounced hiatus from music and social media. Bace Camp Studios (her agency) neither Eyedi herself have confirmed a date for this release, nor what part of the year it would be released.

Her agency, Bace Camp Studios also posted the 60 second clip but with the caption #eyedi #2021 #EP on their official Instagram site on December 8, 2020, but since then have not posted any more content about her on their Instagram page.

2021

Announcement of 해드림! (Hey, Dream) season 2 
Eyedi took an 8 month Hiatus from her YouTube Channel and returned on March 5, 2021, with the announcement of the second season of her series Hey Dream asking fans to leave stories in the comments section which excited viewers as she has not updated social media since 8th December 2020. The video was 20 seconds long and displayed the text '2021? Coming soon' which excited fans who waited a long time for the series to recommence. However, the YouTube channel was left dormant for the rest of that year, with no new uploads or information regarding Eyedi's comeback. 

The 2021 EP which was expected to release in 2021 was not released, and Bace Camp Studios have not announced any information regarding its release date.

2022

Notice of hiatus 
On 10th July 2022, the CEO of Bace Camp Studios revealed that Eyedi is on an indefinite hiatus through a Facebook Group  they claimed (translated from Korean) :

"Eyedi was going to release two new songs in Korea after filming the webdrama, maybe you already heard the song through a short SNS video. She was also preparing for new activities (New EP and showcase) in Japan. Despite the COVID-19 situation, Eyedi's activities were being prepared as actively as before, but it was completely stopped because of her own change of mind. I've been having a hard time until now because I can't dare to convey only company's opinion to tell all her fans without of her agency officials and other artists, so we are trying to give the artist time until this year [...] There was a request to release Eyedi's finished song (posted on Instagram) but the fans who have been watching our company for a long time will know. I hope that the company is not just a place to pursue money, but a helper who can help the artist in a good and equal position. We're sad to say this, but please understand that we cannot release the songs she did not allow. I'm always sorry and thankful to the fans. Please wait a little longer and we'll greet you again as soon as the news is updated. Like the Bace Camp Studio before, other artists will work harder, so please look forward to it. Thank You"

Discography

Studio albums

Extended plays

Singles

Filmography

Web series

Reality television

Notes

References

External links 
 
 

1995 births
Living people
South Korean women pop singers
South Korean female idols
21st-century South Korean women singers
South Korean women singer-songwriters
21st-century South Korean actresses